Fly Away, Young Man! (Spanish: ¡A volar joven!) is a 1947 Mexican comedy film directed by Miguel M. Delgado and starring Cantinflas, Julio Villarreal, Miroslava and Ángel Garasa. It was produced by Posa Films and distributed internationally by Columbia Pictures.

Cast
Cantinflas as Cantinflas
Ángel Garasa as Repelas
Chino Herrera as Sargento
Andrés Soler as Don Lupe Chávez
Carolina Barret as Margarita
Julio Villarreal as Coronel
Maruja Grifell as Doña Encarna
Francisco Jambrina as Capitán
Roberto Cañedo as Soldado
Manuel Trejo Morales as Soldado
Estanislao Schillinsky as Oficial
Miroslava as María Chávez
Ramiro Gamboa as Reportero radiofónico
Armando Arriola as Soldado (uncredited)
Joaquín Cordero as Soldado mensajero (uncredited)
Pedro Elviro as Periodista (uncredited)
Edmundo Espino as Redactor de periódico (uncredited)
Rafael Icardo as Juez del registro civil (uncredited)
Chel López as Oficial (uncredited)
Manuel Noriega as Doctor (uncredited)

References

Bibliography
 Hershfield, Joanne; Maciel, David R. Mexico's Cinema: A Century of Film and Filmmakers. Rowman & Littlefield Publishers, 1999.
 Couret, Nilo. Mock Classicism: Latin American Film Comedy, 1930–1960. University of California Press, 2018.

External links

1947 films
1947 comedy films
Mexican black-and-white films
Mexican comedy films
Films directed by Miguel M. Delgado
1940s Mexican films